Erfurt III is an electoral constituency (German: Wahlkreis) represented in the Landtag of Thuringia. It elects one member via first-past-the-post voting. Under the current constituency numbering system, it is designated as constituency 26. It contains central and southwestern parts of Erfurt, the capital and largest city of Thuringia.

Erfurt III was created in 1990 for the first state election. Since 2019, it has been represented by Bodo Ramelow of The Left.

Geography
As of the 2019 state election, Erfurt III is located entirely within the urban district of Erfurt. It covers the central and southwestern part of the city, specifically the city districts (Stadtteile) of Altstadt, Bischleben-Stedten, Frienstedt, Hochheim, Johannesvorstadt, Krämpfervorstadt, Löbervorstadt, Möbisburg-Rhoda, Molsdorf, and Schmira.

Members
The constituency was held by the Christian Democratic Union (CDU) from its creation in 1990 until 2009, during which time it was represented by Jörg Kallenbach (1990–2004) and Marion Walsmann (2004–2009). Bodo Ramelow of The Left narrowly defeated incumbent Walsmann in 2009; he was in turn defeated by Walsmann in 2014. Walsmann retired from state politics before the 2019 election, and Ramelow won the seat for a second time.

Election results

2019 election

2014 election

2009 election

2004 election

1999 election

1994 election

1990 election

References

Electoral districts in Thuringia
Erfurt
1990 establishments in Germany
Constituencies established in 1990